Bilsington Priory is a former Augustinian priory in Kent, England, about  north of Bilsington and about  south of Ashford. It was founded in 1253 by John Maunsell, with help from the canons of Merton Priory, which provided the first three priors.  Being a monastic house under £200, it was suppressed in the 1536 Dissolution of the Monasteries. Its lands were granted to Anthony St Leger, who exchanged them with Thomas Cranmer, Archbishop of Canterbury.

Some of its buildings survived and were converted into a farmhouse. In 1906 they were restored to designs by JT Micklethwaite. They are Grade I listed. The priory is now a wedding and conference venue.

References

Further reading

External links

 

Monasteries in Kent